This list includes the defunct media outlets since the passage of the Hong Kong national security law (NSL).

Amongst the listed media, Apple Daily, Stand News, and Citizen News are regarded as the three most prominent news outlet critical of the government, of which the former two were also prosecuted by the national security police for "conspiring to publish seditious publications", a colonial-era charge ruled by court as endangering national security.

Some other media had announced closure due to security and other concerns related to the NSL, which are detailed below.

List

References

Hong Kong national security law
Censorship in Hong Kong